Adaklu is one of the constituencies represented in the Parliament of Ghana. It elects one Member of Parliament (MP) by the first past the post system of election. Adaklu is located in the Adaklu district  of the Volta Region of Ghana. It was created in 2012 by the Electoral Commission of Ghana prior to the Ghanaian general election.

Members of Parliament 

The first ever election was held in December 2012 as part of the Ghanaian elections. The National Democratic Congress candidate won the seat with a 10,929 majority. Kwame Agbodza retained his seat in the 2016 elections.

Elections

See also
List of Ghana Parliament constituencies

References

Parliamentary constituencies in the Volta Region